Miles Mander (born Lionel Henry Mander; 14 May 1888 – 8 February 1946), was an English character actor of the early Hollywood cinema, also a film director and producer, and a playwright and novelist. He was sometimes credited as Luther Miles.

Early life
Miles Mander was the second son of Theodore Mander, builder of Wightwick Manor, of the prominent Mander family, industrialists and public servants of Wolverhampton, Staffordshire, England. He was the younger brother of Geoffrey Mander, the Liberal Member of Parliament. He was educated at Harrow School, Middlesex (The Grove House 1901- Easter 1903), Loretto School (in Canada) and McGill University in Montreal. 

He soon broke away from the predictable mould of business and philanthropy. He was an early aviator, a pioneer pilot, flying his Louis Blériot at Pau in 1909 and at the first all-British aviation meeting in July 1910. He won the cup for the first official flight at Brooklands in 1910, and acquired and built Hendon Aerodrome with Claude Grahame-White. He started free ballooning in 1912 and qualified as a pilot, gaining his Royal Aero Club certificate no. 31 on 17 June 1913. He served as a captain in the Royal Army Service Corps in World War I, 1915-19. He spent his twenties in New Zealand farming sheep, with his uncle, Martin Mander.

Film career
Miles Mander entered the British film industry as a writer, producer, and actor, often working with Adrian Brunel. In 1925, he appeared in two Gainsborough productions: The Prude's Fall (1925) and The Pleasure Garden (1926). The former was Alfred Hitchcock's last film as an assistant director to Graham Cutts and the latter was Hitchcock's directorial debut. In 1926–7 he made a series of pioneering sound films. Later he collaborated with Alma Reville, Hitchcock's wife, on the script of The First Born (1928), his feature debut as director, in which he co-starred with Madeleine Carroll. Carroll reappeared in his third film, Fascination (1931).

Mander is better remembered for his character portrayals of oily villains, many of them English gentlemen or upper crust cads – such as Cardinal Richelieu in the musical film The Three Musketeers (1939), a spoof in which the Ritz Brothers played lackeys who substituted for the real Musketeers. In his Hollywood debut, he had portrayed King Louis XIII in the much more serious 1935 version of that same Alexandre Dumas, père classic. One of his meatiest performances came as a dual role in the 1939 serial Daredevils of the Red Circle, in which he played both a kindly industrialist and the ruthless villain who impersonates him (played "out of makeup" by Charles Middleton). Other famous film credits included Wuthering Heights (1939) with Laurence Olivier and Merle Oberon, in which he played Mr. Lockwood, the new tenant at the Grange, who is told the story of Cathy and Heathcliff. In the English version of G.W. Pabst's  Don Quixote (1933), he played the Duke who invites Don Quixote and Sancho Panza to his castle, and in the original To Be or Not to Be (1942), he was one of the two British officers to whom Robert Stack first reveals his suspicions about the treacherous Professor Siletsky (Stanley Ridges).

Personal life

His first wife was Prativa Sundari Devi, a princess of Cooch Behar. She was the daughter of Maharaja Nripendra Narayan and Maharani Suniti Devi of Cooch Behar and paternal aunt of Gayatri Devi, Maharani of Jaipur.

His second wife was Kathleen ('Bunty') French, of Sydney, Australia, by whom he had a son, Theodore, to whom he dedicated a book of memoirs and advice, To My Son—in Confidence (1934). He died suddenly of a heart attack at the Brown Derby restaurant in Los Angeles, aged 57. He is currently buried at Ocean View Burial Park in Burnaby, Greater Vancouver Regional District, British Columbia, Canada.

Filmography

As actor

 Testimony (1920) (film debut)
 A Scandal in Bohemia (1921) as Godfrey Norton 
 The Place of Honour (1921) as Lt. Devereaux
 Half a Truth (1922) as Marquis Sallast
 Open Country (1922) as Honorable William Chevenix
 Lovers in Araby (1924) as Derek Fare
 The Pleasure Garden (1925) as Levett
 The Prude's Fall (1925) as Sir Neville Moreton
 London Love (1926) as Sir James Daring
 Tip Toes (1927) as Rollo Stevens
 The Fake (1927) as Honourable Gerald Pillick
 Parisiennes (1928) as Armand de Marny
 The Joker (1928) as Mr. Borwick
 The King of Carnival (1928) as Borwick
 The Physician (1928) as Walter Amphiel
 Balaclava (1928) as Captain Gardner
 The First Born (1928) as Sir Hugo Boycott
 Perjury (1929) as Adolf Sperber
 The Crooked Billet (1929) as Guy Morrow
 Loose Ends (1930) as Raymond Carteret
 Murder! (1930) as Gordon Druce
 Mary (1931) as Gordon Moore
 The Missing Rembrandt (1932) as Claude Holford
 Lily Christine (1932) as Ambatriadi
 That Night in London (1932) as Harry Tresham
 Bitter Sweet (1933) as Captain Auguste Lutte
 Don Quixote (1933) as The Duke of Fallanga
 Loyalties (1933) as Capt. Ronald Dancy, DSO
 The Private Life of Henry VIII (1933) as Wriothesley
 Matinee Idol (1933) as Harley Travers
 The Four Masked Men (1934) as Rodney Fraser
 The Battle (1934) as Feize
 The Case for the Crown (1934) as James L. Barton
 Death Drives Through (1935) as Garry Ames
 Here's to Romance (1935) as Bert
 The Three Musketeers (1935) as King Louis XIII
 The Flying Doctor (1936) as Spectator at boxing match (uncredited)
 Lloyd's of London (1936) as Jukes
 Slave Ship (1937) as Corey
 Wake Up and Live (1937) as James Stratton
 Youth on Parole (1937) as Sparkler 
 Kidnapped (1938) as Ebenezer Balfour
 The Mad Miss Manton (1938) as Mr. Fred Thomas
 Suez (1938) as Benjamin Disraeli
 The Three Musketeers (1939) as Cardinal Richelieu
 The Little Princess (1939) as Lord Wickham
 Wuthering Heights (1939) as Lockwood
 Daredevils of the Red Circle (1939, Serial) as Horace Granville
 The Man in the Iron Mask (1939) as Aramis
 Stanley and Livingstone (1939) as Sir John Gresham
 Tower of London (1939) as King Henry VI
 The Earl of Chicago (1940) as Attorney General (uncredited)
 Laddie (1940) as Mr. Charles Pryor
 The House of the Seven Gables (1940) as Deacon Arnold Foster
 Road to Singapore (1940) as Sir Malcolm Drake (uncredited)
 Primrose Path (1940) as Homer Adams
 Babies for Sale (1940) as Dr. Wallace Rankin
 Captain Caution (1940) as Lt. Strope
 South of Suez (1940) as Roger Smythe
 Free and Easy (1941) as Solicitor (uncredited) 
 Shadows on the Stairs (1941) as Tom Armitage
 That Hamilton Woman (1941) as Lord Keith
 They Met in Bombay (1941) as Doctor (uncredited)
 Dr. Kildare's Wedding Day (1941) as Dr. John F. Lockberg
 Fly-By-Night (1942) as Prof. Langner
 A Tragedy at Midnight (1942) as Dr Hilary Wilton
 Captains of the Clouds (1942) as Winston Churchill (voice) (uncredited)
 To Be or Not to Be (1942) as Maj. Cunningham
 Fingers at the Window (1942) as Dr. Kurt Immelman
 This Above All (1942) as Major
 Tarzan's New York Adventure (1942) as Portmaster
 Mrs. Miniver (1942) as German Agent on Radio (voice) (uncredited)
 Somewhere I'll Find You (1942) as Floyd Kirsten (uncredited)
 The War Against Mrs. Hadley (1942) as Doctor Leonard V. Meecham
 Apache Trail (1942) as James V. Thorne
 Lucky Jordan (1942) as Kilpatrick
 Journey for Margaret (1942) as Minor Role (uncredited)
 Secrets of the Underground (1942) as Paul Panois
 Assignment in Brittany (1943) as Col. Herman Fournier
 Five Graves to Cairo (1943) as Col. Fitzhume (uncredited)
 First Comes Courage (1943) as Col. Wallace (uncredited)
 Phantom of the Opera (1943) as Maurice Pleyel
 Guadalcanal Diary (1943) as Weatherby (uncredited)
 The Return of the Vampire (1943) as Sir Frederick Fleet
 Madame Curie (1943) as Businessman (uncredited)
 Four Jills in a Jeep (1944) as Col. Hartley (uncredited)
 The Story of Dr. Wassell (1944) as Man (uncredited)
 The White Cliffs of Dover (1944) as Major Loring at hospital (uncredited)
 The Scarlet Claw (1944) as Judge Brisson
 The Pearl of Death (1944) as Giles Conover
 Enter Arsene Lupin (1944) as Charles Seagrave
 Murder, My Sweet (1944) as Mr. Leuwen Grayle
 The Picture of Dorian Gray (1945) as Sir Robert Bentley
 The Brighton Strangler (1945) as Chief Inspector W.R. Allison
 Crime Doctor's Warning (1945) as Frederick Malone
 Week-End at the Waldorf (1945) as British Secretary
 Confidential Agent (1945) as Mr. Brigstock
 The Bandit of Sherwood Forest (1946) as Lord Warrick
 The Walls Came Tumbling Down (1946) as Dr. Marko
 The Imperfect Lady (1947) as Mr. Rogan (final film)

As director

 The Whistler (December 1926) short made in DeForest Phonofilm
 The Sheik of Araby (December 1926) short made in Phonofilm
 Knee Deep in Daisies (December 1926) short made in Phonofilm
 The Fair Maid of Perth (December 1926) short made in Phonofilm
 False Colours (April 1927) short made in Phonofilm
 The Sentence of Death (April 1927), short made in Phonofilm
 Packing Up (April 1927) short made in Phonofilm
 As We Lie (April 1927) short film made in Phonofilm
 The First Born (1928)
The Woman Between (1931)
 Fascination (1931)
 Youthful Folly (1934)
 The Morals of Marcus (1935)
 The Flying Doctor (1936)

As writer

 Lovers in Araby (1924)
 As We Lie (1927) (story)
 The First Born (1928)
 The Woman Between (1931) 
 L'Atlantide (1932) directed by G. W. Pabst 
 The Lodger (1932) 
 The Morals of Marcus (1935)
 The Flying Doctor (1936)

As producer

 The Man Without Desire (1923)
 Knee Deep in Daisies (1926)
 The First Born (1928)
 The Flying Doctor (1936)
 Watchtower Over Tomorrow (1945) (uncredited)

Sources
 Miles Mander, To my Son—in Confidence, Faber, 1934
 Miles Mander, Gentleman by Birth, 1933
 Sir Geoffrey Le Mesurier Mander (ed), The History of Mander Brothers, Wolverhampton. 1955
 C. Nicholas Mander, Varnished Leaves: a biography of the Mander Family of Wolverhampton, 1750-1950, Owlpen Press, 2004
 Patricia Pegg, A Very Private Heritage: the private papers of Samuel Theodore Mander, 1853-1900, Malvern, 1996
 The Times obituary, February 11 1946, p. 6

Notes

External links

Miles Mander biography
 

1888 births
1946 deaths
English male film actors
English male silent film actors
McGill University alumni
New Zealand farmers
People educated at Harrow School
actors from Wolverhampton
British Army personnel of World War I
20th-century English male actors
British expatriate male actors in the United States
Royal Army Service Corps officers